Edyth Carter Beveridge (c. 1862 – 1927) was an American photojournalist. Beveridge documented life in Richmond, Virginia at the turn of the century. Throughout the 1890s she took photographs for the Richmond News and the Richmond Times. Beveridge began authoring the articles that accompanied her photographs. She went on to create photo essays for the Ladies' Home Journal, The Century Magazine, Harper's Weekly, and Collier's.

Her work is in the Library of Congress and the Virginia Historical Society.

Gallery

References

External links

  

1860s births
1927 deaths
Year of birth uncertain
American women journalists
Photographers from Virginia
American women photographers
American photojournalists
Women photojournalists